TER Pays de la Loire is the regional rail network serving Pays de la Loire, France.

TER Network 
The rail and bus network as of May 2022:

Train

Bus

Rolling stock

Multiple units 
 SNCF Class Z 9600
 SNCF Class Z 21500
 SNCF Class X 2100 ''Also called X 92100
 SNCF Class X 4300
 SNCF Class X 4630
 SNCF Class X 4750
 SNCF Class X 72500
 SNCF Class X 73500
Fourteen Z 27500 and eight Z 27500 are expected to be delivered during 2008.

Locomotives 
 SNCF Class BB 22200
 SNCF Class BB 25500
 SNCF Class BB 26000
 SNCF Class BB 67300
 SNCF Class BB 67400

See also
SNCF
Transport express régional
Réseau Ferré de France
List of SNCF stations in Pays de la Loire

References

External links 
 TER Pays de la Loire website

 
Rail transport in Pays de la Loire